Karanbash (Qaranbaş) is a rural locality (a village) in Kopey-Kubovsky Selsoviet, Buzdyaksky District, Bashkortostan, Russia. The population was 49 as of 2010. There are 2 streets in total.

Geography 
Karanbash is located 22 km west of Buzdyak (the district's administrative centre) by road. Kopey-Kubovo is the nearest rural locality.

References 

Rural localities in Buzdyaksky District